The 1994 British motorcycle Grand Prix was the tenth round of the 1994 Grand Prix motorcycle racing season. It took place on 24 July 1994 at the Donington Park circuit.

This was the 25th and last grand prix win for defending 500cc world champion Kevin Schwantz.

500 cc classification

 Carl Fogarty crashed in practice and withdrew from the event.
 Norifumi Abe suffered a broken hand in a crash during practice and withdrew from the event.

250 cc classification

125 cc classification

References

British motorcycle Grand Prix
British
Motorcycle Grand Prix
July 1994 sports events in the United Kingdom